
The parliament of the Republic of Ireland is the Oireachtas.

Irish parliament may also refer to:

Before partition
Parliament of Ireland, a legislature on the island of Ireland from 1297 until 1800
From 1801 to 1922 Irish MPs sat in the Parliament of the United Kingdom of Great Britain and Ireland
Irish Parliament, the legislative body for Ireland that was intended to have been created by the Government of Ireland Act 1914 (Third Home Rule Bill) of 1914
Dáil Éireann (Irish Republic), the revolutionary parliament of the 1919–1922 Irish Republic

Following partition

Republic of Ireland
Parliament of Southern Ireland, the parliament for Southern Ireland from 1920 to 1921
Oireachtas (Irish Free State), the legislature of the 1922–1937 Irish Free State
Oireachtas, the legislature of the Republic of Ireland since 1937

Northern Ireland
Parliament of Northern Ireland, the legislature of Northern Ireland from 1921 to 1972
Northern Ireland Assembly (1973), a power-sharing legislature for Northern Ireland from 1973 to 1974
Northern Ireland Assembly (1982), from 1982 to 1986
Northern Ireland Assembly, the devolved legislature of Northern Ireland since 1999